The Asia/Oceania Zone was one of the three zones of the regional Davis Cup competition in 2017.

In the Asia/Oceania Zone there were four different tiers, called groups, in which teams competed against each other to advance to the upper tier. Winners in Group II advanced to the Asia/Oceania Zone Group I. Teams who lost their respective ties competed in the relegation play-offs, with winning teams remaining in Group II, whereas teams who lost their play-offs were relegated to the Asia/Oceania Zone Group III in 2018.

Participating nations

Seeds:
 
 
 
 

Remaining nations:

Draw

 and  relegated to Group III in 2018.
 promoted to Group I in 2018.

First round

Pakistan vs. Iran

Vietnam vs. Hong Kong

Philippines vs. Indonesia

Kuwait vs. Thailand

Second round

Pakistan vs. Hong Kong 

 Hong Kong withdrew from the tie citing security concerns.

Thailand vs. Philippines

Play-offs

Iran vs. Vietnam

Indonesia vs. Kuwait

Third round

Pakistan vs. Thailand

References

External links
Official Website

Asia/Oceania Zone Group II
Davis Cup Asia/Oceania Zone